Leopold Auerbach (27 April 1828 – 30 September 1897) was a German anatomist and neuropathologist born in Breslau.

Education and career
Auerbach studied medicine at the Universities of Breslau, Berlin and the Leipzig. He became a physician in 1849, obtained his habilitation in 1863. From 1872 he was an associate professor of neuropathology at the University of Breslau.

Discoveries
Auerbach was among the first physicians to diagnose the nervous system using histological staining methods. He published a number of papers on neuropathological problems and muscle-related disorders.

He is credited with the discovery of Plexus myentericus Auerbachi, or Auerbach's plexus, a layer of ganglion cells that provide control of movements of the gastro-intestinal tract, also known as the "myenteric plexus".

"Friedreich–Auerbach disease" is named after Auerbach and pathologist Nikolaus Friedreich (1825-1882). It is a rare disease characterized by hemi-hypertrophy of the facial features, tongue, and tonsils.

Family
Auerbach died in Breslau. His son Felix Auerbach was a renowned physicist.

Bibliography
 Ueber Percussion der Muskeln; in: Zeitschrift für rationelle Medizin, Leipzig and Heidelberg 1862.
 Bau der Blut- und Lymph-Capillaren; in: Centralblatt für die medicinischen Wissenschaften, Berlin, 1865. 
 Lymphgefässe des Darms; in: [Virchows] Archiv für pathologische Anatomie und Physiologie und für klinische Medicin, Berlin, 1865. volume 33. 
 Wahre Muskelhypertrophie; in: [Virchows] Archiv für pathologische Anatomie und Physiologie und für klinische Medicin, Berlin, 1871, volume 53.

See also 
German inventors and discoverers

Sources 
Leopold Auerbach @ Who Named It

German anatomists
German pathologists
1828 births
1897 deaths
University of Breslau alumni
Academic staff of the University of Breslau
Auerbach family
Physicians from Wrocław